Air Kentucky was a commuter airline based in Owensboro, Kentucky. It was also known for a time as Owensboro Aviation. It began operations in 1974, and joined the Allegheny Commuter system for Allegheny Airlines, and later USAir Express. The airline ended its operations in 1989.

The airline was mentioned in the film The Life Aquatic with Steve Zissou; one of the main characters, Ned Plimpton, is a pilot for Air Kentucky, however, in the film Ned mentioned that the airline was based out of Louisville, Kentucky.

Destinations

Illinois
Bloomington
Champaign/Urbana
Chicago
Mount Vernon*
Peoria
Springfield
Indiana
Evansville
Fort Wayne
Indianapolis
South Bend
Terre Haute*
Kentucky
Bowling Green*
Cincinnati
Frankfort*
Lexington
London/Corbin*
Louisville
Owensboro
Paducah
Missouri
St. Louis
Tennessee
Clarksville*
Nashville

Those airports marked with an asterisk (*) are no longer served by commercial airline service.

Fleet
 13 Beechcraft Model 99
 2 EMB-110 P
 4 Fairchild Swearingen Metroliner SA-227

See also
 List of defunct airlines of the United States

References
AirTimes.com
TimeTableImages.com

Owensboro, Kentucky
Airlines established in 1974
Airlines disestablished in 1989
1974 establishments in Kentucky
1989 disestablishments in Kentucky
American companies established in 1974
American companies disestablished in 1989
Airlines based in Kentucky
Transportation in Daviess County, Kentucky